The Little River is a  river in southeastern New Hampshire in the United States.  It is located entirely in the town of North Hampton, and it flows directly into the Atlantic Ocean, south of Little Boars Head.

The river rises in a forested wetland in the northern part of North Hampton and flows south, passing under U.S. 1. The river turns southeast, passes through Mill Pond and under NH 111, and enters the Little River salt marsh. The river enters the Atlantic Ocean by passing under NH 1A, using a new, large culvert installed by the New Hampshire Coastal Program in an effort to improve tidal flow into the salt marsh.

See also

List of rivers of New Hampshire

References

Rivers of New Hampshire
Rivers of Rockingham County, New Hampshire